Senator Beyer may refer to:

Lee Beyer (born 1948), Oregon State Senate
Roger Beyer (fl. 1990s–2000s), Oregon State Senate
Rudolph Beyer (1889–1970), Wisconsin State Senate